Grimari is a city located in the Ouaka prefecture in Central African Republic, approximately  away from the capital, Bangui. The politician Abel Goumba was born in Grimari.

History 
On March 1, 1910, Grimari replaced Pouyamba as the capital of the subdivision in the district of Kémo. This subdivision was attached to the constituency of Bambari from the 1st of January1920. In 1930, the African Textile Company set up a ginning factory, this cotton company would become Cotonaf.

After World War II, the administrative reform of October 16, 1946, made Grimari a district capital of the Ouaka-Kotto region. On January 23, 1961, the independent Central African Republic established the city of Grimari as the capital of the sub-prefecture.

On April 13, 2014, the Anti-Balaka attacked the Séléka in Grimari with many people being killed and displaced. Anti-Balaka forces reportedly took control of the town.

On August 31, 2016, Anti-Balaka forces in Grimari erected roadblocks preventing a MINUSCA convoy from moving and forcing them to return to Bambari. In November 2016 Grimari was reported to be under control of security forces including police and gendarmerie.

On March 15, 2020, Anti-Balaka forces attacked a MINUSCA base in Grimari, killing one peacekeeper. On August 3, Anti-Balaka forces attacked Grimari blocking roads to Sibut and Bambari. FACA managed to recapture the city the same day, killing one Anti-Balaka commander. On December 20, rebels from Union for Peace in the Central African Republic took control of the centre of Grimari after bypassing a MINUSCA roadblock. On January 9, 2021, rebels attacked Grimari. However, government forces were reportedly in control of the town. On January 15, rebels ambushed a Burundian peacekeeper in the town of Grimari, killing him and injuring two other Bangladeshi peacekeepers.

References 

Sub-prefectures of the Central African Republic

Populated places in Ouaka